Selemani Jumanne Zedi (born 28 October 1965) is a Tanzanian CCM politician and Member of Parliament for Bukene constituency since 2010.

References

1965 births
Living people
Chama Cha Mapinduzi MPs
Tanzanian MPs 2010–2015
Azania Secondary School alumni
Shinyanga Commercial School alumni
University of Dar es Salaam alumni